Valeria Bertacco is a professor of Electrical Engineering and Computer Science as well as Vice Provost for Engaged Learning at the University of Michigan. She previously served as the Associate Dean for Academic Programs and Initiatives at the University of Michigan Rackham Graduate School.

Bertacco headed the Center for Applications Driving Architectures (ADA) at the University of Michigan. Her work at the center includes leading initiatives to design processors that are especially tailored to run specific algorithms. In 2017, she was elected a fellow of the Institute of Electrical and Electronics Engineers for her contributions to Computer-aided Verification and Reliable System Design.

References 

Year of birth missing (living people)
Living people
University of Michigan faculty
Electrical engineers
Computer scientists
Fellow Members of the IEEE